Stanisław Deutschmann (17 April 1906 – 9 December 1964) was a Polish footballer. He played in one match for the Poland national football team in 1928.

References

External links
 

1906 births
1964 deaths
Polish footballers
Poland international footballers
Place of birth missing
Association football midfielders
Pogoń Lwów players